5-Dehydroepisterol is a sterol and an intermediate in steroid biosynthesis, particularly synthesis of brassinosteroids. It is formed from episterol through action of ERG3, the C-5 sterol desaturase in the yeast and is then converted into 24-methylenecholesterol by 7-dehydrocholesterol reductase.

Episterol and 5-dehydroepisterol are found in Leishmania.

References

Sterols